The term hesitation step refers to a ceremonial form of walking. It is typically used during the entrance to a religious ceremony.

The walk consists of stepping forward, pausing, rocking back on the back leg, then proceeding to the next step forward. In other variations, there is simply a pause between steps with the feet poised together.

A form of the hesitation step is often used by brides and bridal parties in the United States and Europe during their entrance to the wedding ceremony. It is also often used during graduations, particularly from religious schools for girls.

See also
 Wedding

Wedding traditions